Flugstaffel Meinecke is a German television series produced in 1989 and first aired in 1990.

External links
 

1990 German television series debuts
1990 German television series endings
Aviation television series
German-language television shows
Television in East Germany